Guy XX de Laval, François de Coligny (6 May 1585 – 3 December 1605) was the Count of Laval (Mayenne) and Baron of Quintin. He was son of Guy XIX de Laval and Anne d'Algère.

In 1588, Anne d'Algère took him to Sedan so that he could be raised as a Protestant. In April 1605, however, Guy XX de Laval converted to Catholicism. 

Near the end of 1605 he led an expedition in Hungary against the Turks and died in combat on December 3 of that year. 

He was the last Count of Laval to take the name of Guy.

See also
House of Laval

Bibliography
 Malcolm Walsby, The Counts of Laval: Culture, Patronage and Religion in Fifteenth and Sixteenth-Century France (Ashgate, Aldershot, 2007)

1585 births
1605 deaths
Military personnel killed in action
House of Laval
Counts of France